William Lithgow may refer to:

William Lithgow (traveller and author) (1582–1645), Scottish traveller and author
William Lithgow (judge) (1715–1798), judge for the Court of Common Pleas of Massachusetts
William Lithgow (auditor-general) (1784–1864), Scottish clergyman, first Auditor General of New South Wales
William Lithgow (shipbuilder) (1854–1908), Scottish shipbuilder
William Lithgow (cricketer) (1920–1997), English cricketer and British Army officer
Sir William Lithgow, 2nd Baronet (1934–2022), Scottish industrialist from shipbuilding family